The Economists' Voice is a publishing forum for professional economists that seeks to fill the gap between op-ed pages of newspapers and scholarly journal articles. Published by Walter de Gruyter, the forum brings to bear scholarly work and academic perspectives on policy issues that are of broad concern. It is edited by Professor Joseph Stiglitz (Columbia University), along with Jeffrey Zwiebel (Stanford University) and Michael Cragg.

Its articles are published by the Columbia University Press.

References

External links
 The Economists' Voice

Works about business
Economics publications